Gonnostramatza, Gonnos-Tramatza in sardinian language, is a comune (municipality) in the Province of Oristano in the Italian region Sardinia, located about  northwest of Cagliari and about  southeast of Oristano, in the Marmilla.

References

External links

 Official website

Cities and towns in Sardinia